Head On is an album by American jazz vibraphonist Bobby Hutcherson recorded in 1971 and released on the Blue Note label. The album was rereleased on CD with three additional recordings from the sessions as bonus tracks.

Reception
The Allmusic review by Matt Collar awarded the album 3 stars and stated "Head On is a highly cerebral and atmospheric affair that is somewhat different than his other equally experimental '70s work... Fans of expansive, searching '70s jazz will definitely want to seek Head On out".

Track listing
 "At the Source: Ashes & Rust/Eucalyptus/Obsidian" (Todd Cochran) - 8:20
 "Many Thousands Gone" (Cochran) - 11:16
 "Mtume" (Hutcherson) - 8:24
 "Clockwork of the Spirits" (Cochran) 7:16
 "Togo Land" (Cochran) - 15:42 Bonus track on CD reissue
 "Jonathan" (Cochran) - 9:53 Bonus track on CD reissue
 "Hey Harold" (Hutcherson) - 17:40 Bonus track on CD reissue

Personnel
Bobby Hutcherson - vibes, marimba
Oscar Brashear - trumpet, flugelhorn
George Bohanon, Louis Spears - trombone
Willie Ruff - French horn
Fred Jackson, Jr. - piccolo
Harold Land - tenor saxophone, flute
Delbert Hill, Charles Owens, Herman Riley, Ernie Watts - reeds
Todd Cochran - piano, arranger
William Henderson - electric piano
Reggie Johnson, James Leary III - bass
Leon "Ndugu" Chancler, Nesbert "Stix" Hooper, Woody Theus - drums
Warren Bryant - congas, bongos
Donald Smith - vocals

References 

Blue Note Records albums
Bobby Hutcherson albums
1971 albums